Karpovsky, feminine: Karpovskaya is a Russian-language surname. Notable people with the surname include:
Alex Karpovsky (born 1975), American director, actor, screenwriter, producer and film editor
Perl Karpovskaya, birth name of Polina Zhemchuzhina (1897-1970), Soviet politician, best known as wife of the Soviet foreign minister Vyacheslav Molotov
Oren Karpovsky, musician from the American punk band The Deep Eynde
Karpovsky, character from Secret Agent (1947 film)

 Russian-language surnames